This is the complete list of medallists in Dancesport at the Asian Games in 2010.

Standard dance

Five dances

Quickstep

Slow foxtrot

Tango

Waltz

Latin dance

Five dances

Cha-cha-cha

Jive

Paso doble

Samba

References

ADSF Website

Dancesport
medalists